Mariposite is a mineral which is a chromium-rich variety of mica, which imparts an attractive green color to the generally white dolomitic marble in which it is commonly found. It was named for Mariposa, California, United States, though it can be found in several other places in the Sierra Nevada. It is also found in Marblemount, Washington, in the North Cascades, as well as in a few locations in Newfoundland, Canada, where it is called virginite, and in Europe.

It is not an officially classified mineral, but is a chromium-rich phengite, which is a high silica variety of muscovite. It is the chromium that gives it its distinctive green color.

The term "mariposite" also refers to the stone in which the green mica is found.  This stone is metamorphic rock, containing varying amounts of dolomite and quartz.  Larger proportions of quartz give it a more attractive, translucent appearance. It is used as a decorative construction material, in walls, monuments, and bridges.  It is also made into jewelry.

Chemical composition 

References

External links
Mariposite from the Alameda Mine by Mindat

Potassium minerals
Aluminium minerals
Chromium minerals
Mica group
Mariposa County, California